Marutea Atoll (Marutea Sud), also known as Lord Hood Island, Marutea-i-runga, and Nuku-nui,  is an atoll in the far southeast of the Tuamotu group of French Polynesia. It lies in the east-northeast part of the Gambier (commune), about 72 km northeast from Maria Atoll.

Marutea Atoll is irregular in shape and bound by a reef broken by passes into the  lagoon. Its islands are low and flat and the main village, Auorotini, is located at the northern end of the atoll. It is populated by ex Gambier Islanders looking for pearls and maintaining the pearl farms on the atoll.

Marutea Sud should not be confused with Marutea Nord located in the western area of the Tuamotu Archipelago at 17˚ 07' S, 143˚ 11' W.

History
The first recorded European to sight this atoll was Spanish explorer Pedro Fernández de Quirós on 4 February 1606. He called it San Telmo. Other Spanish names were San Blas, given by de Quiros' captain Diego de Prado y Tovar, and Corral de Agua is found in some contemporary charts (in Spanish, water corral). Edwards renamed it "Lord Hood".

According to Russian Admiral Adam Johann von Krusenstern Marutea was once inhabited by the ancient Polynesians. British mariner Frederick William Beechey found a stone-walled hut upon it in 1825.

In 1984 Marutea Atoll was bought by Robert Wan, the main Tahitian black pearl trader, in order to engage in cultured black pearl farming.

A private airfield was built in 1993.

Administration
Administratively Marutea Sud belongs to the commune of the Gambier (commune).

References

Polynesian archaeological remains
Atoll names

Robert Wan
 Jean-Claude_Brouillet, L'ile de perles noires, Editions Robert Laffont S.A., Paris 1984

External links
Atoll list (in French)

Atolls of the Tuamotus